Pirenella is a genus of sea snails, marine gastropod mollusks in the family Potamididae.

Species
Species within the genus Pirenella include:
 Pirenella alata (Philippi, 1849)
 ''Pirenella arabica Reid, 2016
 Pirenella asiatica Ozawa & Reid, 2016
 Pirenella austrocingulata Reid, 2015
 † Pirenella balatonica (Tausch, 1886) 
 Pirenella caiyingyai (Qian, Fang & He, 2013)
 Pirenella cancellata Ozawa & Reid, 2016
 Pirenella cingulata (Gmelin, 1791)
 Pirenella conica (Blainville, 1829)
 † Pirenella delicatula Reid, 2016
 † Pirenella etrusca (Mayer, 1864) 
 Pirenella graeca (Deshayes, 1835) 
 Pirenella incisa (Hombron & Jacquinot, 1848)
 Pirenella microptera (Kiener, 1841)
 Pirenella nanhaiensis Fu & Reid, 2016
 Pirenella nipponica Ozawa & Reid, 2016
 Pirenella pupiformis Ozawa & Reid, 2016
 Pirenella retifera (G. B. Sowerby II, 1855)
 Pirenella rugosa Reid, 2016
 † Pirenella subconica (Pallary, 1901)
 † Pirenella supracretacea (Tausch, 1886) 
Species brought into synonymy
 Pirenella boswellae (Barnard, 1963): synonym of Pseudovertagus clava (Gmelin, 1791)
 Pirenella cailliaudi (Potiez & Michaud, 1838): synonym of Pirenella conica (Blainville, 1829)
 Pirenella insculpta (G. B. Sowerby II, 1865): synonym of Zeacumantus plumbeus (G.B. Sowerby II, 1855)
 Pirenella layardii (A. Adams, 1854): synonym of Pirenella conica (Blainville, 1829)
 Pirenella mammillata (Gray, 1847): synonym of Pirenella conica'' (Blainville, 1829)

References

 Lozouet P. (1986). Redéfinition des genres Potamides et Pirenella (Gastropoda, Prosobranchia) à partir des espèces actuelles et fossiles. Implications phylétiques et biogéographiques.. Annales de Paléontologie 72: 163-210

External links
 Jousseaume (F.P.) 1894. Diagnoses des coquilles de nouveaux mollusques. Bulletin de la Société Philomathique de Paris, 8(6): 98-105.
 Reid D.G. & Ozawa T. (2016). The genus Pirenella Gray, 1847 (= Cerithideopsilla Thiele, 1929) (Gastropoda: Potamididae) in the Indo-West Pacific region and Mediterranean Sea. Zootaxa. 4076(1): 1-91

Potamididae